Mary Larteh is a woman traditional leader in Liberia. She is the Paramount Chief of the Jorquelleh Chiefdom in the Bong County.

Chieftaincy 
Larteh was appointed under the Presidency of Ellen Johnson Sirleaf. She heads 14 paramount chiefs in her county.

She was suspended from this position in 2016 over an alleged involvement in the illegal establishment of Sande bushes in her community. According to the Executive Director of Women Solidarity Incorporated, her action was seen as a means of denying girls of school going age of their right to access education. She was however reinstated the following year by the Ministry of Internal Affairs and is still the chief of the area.

Advocacy 
In the 2017 runoff elections in Liberia, she admonished the youth of her community to uphold peace, and avoid resorting to or being used to instigate any form of violence during and after the election process.

Chief Mary Larteh is one of the several women traditional leaders whose leadership is being studied under a University of Ghana project titled "Women and Political Participation in Africa: A Comparative Study of Representation and Role of Female Chiefs", which is funded by the Andrew W. Mellon Foundation. In this project, a mixed-methods approach is adopted to comparatively study women’s representation in the institution of chieftaincy and their influence on women’s rights and wellbeing in Botswana, Ghana, Liberia, and South Africa. Lead researchers on the project, Peace A. Medie, Adriana A. E Biney, Amanda Coffie and Cori Wielenga, have also published an opinion piece titled "Women traditional leaders could help make sure the pandemic message is heard" in The Conversation news, which discusses how women traditional leaders can educate their subjects on Covid-19.

References 

Living people
Tribal chiefs
People from Bong County
Year of birth missing (living people)